Graphium androcles, the giant swordtail, is a butterfly of the genus Graphium belonging to the family Papilionidae (swallowtails). The species was first described by Jean Baptiste Boisduval in 1836.

Description
Females are larger than males. The base of the upper wings is white with three black diagonal parallel stripes. The other half of the upper wings is black, crossed by two thin white stripes. The hindwings are white, with black markings on the lower margin. The underside is similar to the upperside, but the white is partially greenish. The hindwings terminate in a very long "tail", which is the longest among all members of the relevant family. The body is black, with white sides of the abdomen.

Distribution
Graphium androcles can be found in Indonesia (Sulawesi, Sula Islands).

Protection
It is protected in Bantimurung – Bulusaraung National Park.

References
 "Graphium androcles (Boisduval, 1836)". BioLib. Retrieved February 5, 2020.
 {{cite web |last=Savela |first=Markku |date=April 15, 2019 |url=https://www.nic.funet.fi/pub/sci/bio/life/insecta/lepidoptera/ditrysia/papilionoidea/papilionidae/papilioninae/graphium/#androcles |title=Graphium androcles (Boisduval, 1836) |website=Lepidoptera and Some Other Life Forms |accessdate=February 5, 2020}}
 Butterflies of Southeastern Sulawesi

External links

 "Graphium androcles Boisduval, 1836". Insecta.pro.
 "Graphium androcles". Butterflycorner''.

Butterflies described in 1836
androcles
Butterflies of Indonesia
Taxa named by Jean Baptiste Boisduval